TachoSil is a collagen sponge coated with the human coagulation factors fibrinogen and thrombin. It is used during surgery to stop local bleeding on internal organs (hemostasis). The sponge is manufactured from horse tendons. TachoSil reacts upon contact with blood, other body fluids or saline to form a clot that glues it to the tissue surface. Hemostasis is reached in a few minutes, and the sponge is absorbed by the body within several weeks.

Some patients experience hypersensitivity or allergic reactions. In rare cases, it could turn into severe hypersensitive reaction. Those who are prone to having a systemic reaction to horse proteins or human blood products are not good candidates for use of TachoSil.

See also
 Fibrin glue

References

External links
 

Adhesives
Blood
Surgery
Takeda Pharmaceutical Company brands